This article contains a list of episodes of the United States television series Cannon, which were broadcast on CBS between 1971 and 1976.

Series overview
Cannon consists of a 2-hour pilot, five seasons of episodes, and a 2-hour TV-movie.

Episodes

Pilot (1971)

Season 1 (1971–72)

Season 2 (1972–73)

Season 3 (1973–74)

Season 4 (1974–75)

Season 5 (1975–76)

Television film (1980)

Home releases
The first three season were released between 2008 and 2013. A Complete Series edition was released on September 8, 2015 by VEI Entertainment

See also
 List of Barnaby Jones episodes - includes Part 2 of "The Deadly Conspiracy of the Dropped Flower Pot"

References

External links
 
 

Cannon